The Chief Scout Executive is the top professional of the National Council of the Boy Scouts of America. In most similar non-profit organizations, this is equivalent to the position of CEO, national executive director or secretary general.

Roger Mosby is the current Chief Scout Executive, succeeding Michael B. Surbaugh in December 2019. Mosby was initially title President and CEO (not being a professional Scouter), however in May 2021 Mosby received a commission as a professional Scouter and was appointed to the Chief Scout Executive position in May 2021.

This position should not be confused with the position of Chief Scout. Many National Scout associations still use this position; however, it is always for a volunteer position, not a paid one. In the BSA, only three people (Ernest Thompson Seton, James E. West and Elbert K. Fretwell) have held the position of Chief Scout, which is separate and distinct from the position of CSE.

History
Edgar M. Robinson was the YMCA's first International Secretary for Boys' Work and had written an article in the national YMCA's magazine praising the Scouting program in use at many YMCA's in the country.  He saw the need to help William D. Boyce with the organization of the BSA, met with Boyce on May 3, 1910, and agreed to help Boyce organize the BSA national leadership at its June meeting.  He recommended John Alexander, another YMCA executive, be appointed the managing secretary, and Alexander served in that role from June until the end of the year, when the national executive board appointed James E. West to that position, effective January 1911.  West took on the position initially for a sixth month period, settled into the role, and assumed the new position of Chief Scout Executive by agreement with the board in November 1911. 

There have been 14 (as of now) men who have served in the position of Chief Scout Executive during the long history of the BSA.  All other professional Scouters and employees of the National Council BSA work under the direction of the Chief Scout Executive.

Over the history of the BSA, the sitting Chief Scout Executive has during some periods appointed a Deputy Chief Scout Executive and/or one or more Assistant Chief Scouts Executive.  In most cases, these men reported directly to the CSE, but in some cases, an assistant CSE worked under the direction of the Deputy CSE.  Although the Deputy CSE has normally been considered the "right hand" person to the Chief Scout Executive, there is not an automatic succession to the top position, which has been filled by appointment by a committee of the national executive board on each occasion that a new Chief Scout Executive was needed.

List of Chief Scout Executives

Deputy Chief Scout Executives

List of Assistant Chief Scouts Executive

See also
National Executive Board of the Boy Scouts of America

References

External links